Megamax was a pay television and an analog channel that was broadcast in Hungary, Romania, Czech Republic and Slovakia, owned by AMC Networks International in Central Europe. It was aimed primarily at young males, 5–17 years old and broadcast animated series and teen series.

The channel closed down on 1 January 2020 at 06:00 CET. Its channel slot transitioned to JimJam.

History
Megamax was first launched in Hungary on 18 April 2011 at 16:00 CET on Telekom and timeshared with Zone Club, which was broadcast 24 hours a day since New Year's Day 2007. On 1 September 2011, Megamax increased broadcast time from 13:00 CET, and on 1 December 2011 from 07:00 CET. On 1 February 2012, Zone Club closed, and the channel became available on the Hungarian UPC Direct.

The channel was launched in Romania on 19 November 2012  and on 1 December 2012, in the Czech Republic and Slovakia.

Megamax began running 24 hours a day in the Czech Republic, Hungary and Slovakia on 1 October 2014 and in Romania on 15 January 2015.

Despite having obtained retransmission agreements with most operators, on 4 November 2019, AMC announced the channel's closure. The main reason of the closure was that the channel failed to obtain a higher audience share to run Hungarian advertising.

Former Programmes
 Almost Naked Animals
 Angry Birds Toons
 Adventurers: Masters of Time
 Alienators: Evolution Continues
 The Avatars
 Bernard
 Blue Water High
 Casper's Scare School
 Chuck's Choice
 Code Lyoko
 Code Lyoko: Evolution
 Cosmic Quantum Ray
 Cyboars
 Dance Academy
 Dark Oracle
 Dork Hunters from Outer Space
 Degrassi: The Next Generation
 Delilah and Julius
 Dream Defenders
 Eon Kid
 Extreme Football
 Flight Squad
 Freefonix
 Galactik Football
 Gaming Show (In My Parents' Garage)
 Ghost Rockers
 Girl vs. Boy
 Gormiti: The Lords of Nature Return!
 G.I. Joe: Renegades
 Hero Factory
 Hot Wheels: Battle Force 5
 Huntik: Secrets & Seekers
 Invizimals
 Kamen Rider: Dragon Knight
 Kong
 Legends of Chima
 Legend Of Enyo
 Legend of the Dragon
 Linkers, Codes Secrets
 Looped
 Magi-Nation
 Marcus Level
 Matt Hatter Chronicles
 Maggie & Bianca: Fashion Friends
 Max Steel
 Mudpit
 M.I. High
 Mixels
 Metajets
 Mr. Young
 My Giant Friend
 Nerds and Monsters
 Ninjago
 Numb Chucks
 Nutri Ventures – The Quest for the 7 Kingdoms
 Oscar's Oasis
 Pac-Man and the Ghostly Adventures
 Piggy Tales
 Plankton Invasion
 Power Rangers
 Radio Free Roscoe
 Ready for This
 Really Me
 Roman Mysteries
 ROX
 Sam Fox: Extreme Adventures
 Scaredy Squirrel
 Shoebox Zoo
 Skyland
 Slugterra
 Some Assembly Required
 Sonic Boom
 Speed Racer: The Next Generation
 Spike Team
 Stoked
 Stormworld
 Strange Hill High
 Street Football
 Super 4
 Supa Strikas
 Tara Duncan: The Evil Empress
 Teen Days
 The Amaz. E. Friends
 The Basketeers
 The Elephant Princess
 The Invisible Man
 The Latest Buzz
 The Sparticle Mystery
 The Stanley Dynamic
 The Twisted Whiskers Show
 The Wannabes
 Transformers: Armada
 Transformers: Energon
 Transformers: Cybertron
 Voltron Force
 Voltron: The Third Dimension
 What's Up Warthogs!'
 Wolverine and the X-Men Zeke's Pad Zip Zip Zorro: Generation Z''

See also
 AMC Networks International
 Minimax

References

AMC Networks International
Children's television networks
Television channels and stations established in 2012
Television channels and stations disestablished in 2020
Defunct television channels in Hungary
Defunct television channels in Romania